Ahdri Zhina Mandiela (born May 10, 1953) is a Toronto-based dub poet, theatre producer, and artistic director. She has gained worldwide acclaim for her books, music recordings, film, theatre and dance productions.
Mandiela is the founder and artistic director of "b current", a not-for-profit performance arts company in Toronto.

In 2006 she was selected to write and direct a project for Winnie Mandela as part of the 50th anniversary of the South African Women's Liberation Movement.

Works

Books and music
 Speshal Rikwes [Poems in Dialect] (p. 1985)
 Dark Diaspora... in Dub (p. 1991) 
 step into my head (1995)

Theatre
 A Midsummer Night's Dream with "a contemporary, urban interpretation with a Caribbean twist." (2007)
 "Who Knew Grannie: A Dub Aria" (2010)

Film
 on/black/stage/women a documentary covering 30 years of contributions made by Black women to Toronto's theatre scene.

Awards
 2006 The Silver Ticket Award, for Outstanding Contribution to the Development of Canadian Theatre
 Victor Martyn Lynch-Staunton Award – Theatre (2007)

See also

 Postcolonial feminism

References

External links
 jumping in head first: an interview with ahdri zhina mandiela Susan Gingell, University of Saskatchewan

1953 births
Living people
Jamaican expatriates in Canada
Writers from Toronto
20th-century Canadian poets
Canadian women poets
Black Canadian writers
Jamaican dub poets
20th-century Canadian women writers
Black Canadian women
Black Canadian filmmakers